Sinocyclocheilus anshuiensis is a species of ray-finned fish in the genus Sinocyclocheilus.

References 

anshuiensis
Fish described in 2013